Mahatmudu is a 1976 Telugu-language drama film, produced and directed by M. S. Gopinath under the Rajeswari Chitra banner. It stars Akkineni Nageswara Rao and Sharada, with music composed by T. Chalapathi Rao.

Plot
The film begins with Zamindar Parvathamma has two sons Venu Gopal & Nanda Gopal though the elder one Nanda Gopal is a foster she treats both equally and calls the two Gopal only. Venu Gopal loves a wise girl Seeta before he reveals it to his mother, unexpectedly, Nandu gets acquainted and starts liking Seeta. Knowing it, Parvathamma moves with the marriage proposal which Seeta also agrees with as she is confused about names. Being cognizant of it, Venu stupefies but immediately retrieves, and couples up Seeta with Nandu by convincing her. Soon after, Nandu learns about the love affair between Venu & Seeta when sly Manager Basavaiah provokes his suspension which makes Venu leave the house. On his way, he rescues a girl Radha daughter of Zamindar Ranganatham from suicide as she is pregnant before marriage. To provide legitimacy to her child, Venu pretends to her husband. On the other side, Nandu goes into the clutches of a malicious Giri and becomes a spoiled brat. Time passes, Seeta & Radha give birth to babies and Parvathamma passes away. Eventually, Venu ameliorates the lifestyles of the destitute when everyone in that area adores him as a deity. Here, Giri keeps an evil eye on Seeta, out of humiliation she too leaves the house and fortunately, reaches Venu. Parallelly, Giri & Basavaiah swindle Nandu and necks him out. Thereafter, Giri shows his presence at Radha's residence as he is the person who deceived her. At that juncture, he spots Seeta and tries to molest her when the wheel of fortune brings Nandu to the same place and rescues her. At present, engaged Radha seeks to kill Giri when Venu shields him against harm. At last, Giri reforms plead pardon and accepts Radha. Finally, the movie ends with Venu dedicating his life to the welfare of the people.

Cast
Akkineni Nageswara Rao as Venu Gopal
Sharada as Seeta
Satyanarayana as Nanda Gopal
Murali Mohan as Prasad
Kanta Rao as Ranganatham
Allu Ramalingaiah as Basavaiah
Mukkamala as Doctor
Thyagaraju as Bandipootu Pattakatti Papaiah
Giri Babu as Giri
K.K.Sarma as Bhajarangam
G. Varalakshmi as Parvathamma 
Roja Ramani as Padma
Prabha as Radha
Jaya Malini as item number
Jhansi

Crew
Art: G. V. Subba Rao
Choreography: Chinni-Sampath, Taara
Dialogues: Acharya Aatreya
Lyrics: C. Narayana Reddy, Kosaraju
Playback: V. Ramakrishna, P. Susheela, Madhavapeddi Ramesh, Wilson, L.R.Anjali
Music: T. Chalapathi Rao 
Editing: I. V. Shanmugam
Cinematography: P. S. Selvaraj
Story - Screenplay - Producer - Director: M. S. Gopinath
Banner: Rajeswari Chitra
Release Date: 1977

Soundtrack

Music composed by T. Chalapathi Rao. Music released on Audio Company.

References

1970s Telugu-language films
Indian drama films
Films scored by T. Chalapathi Rao